Pravin Prabhakar Arlekar is an Indian politician from Goa and a member of the Goa Legislative Assembly. Pravin  won the Pernem Assembly constituency on the Bharatiya Janata Party ticket in the 2022 Goa Legislative Assembly election.

References

1975 births
Living people
Goa MLAs 2022–2027
Bharatiya Janata Party politicians from Goa
Maharashtrawadi Gomantak Party politicians
People from North Goa district